Tariq J. "T.J." Vasher (born August 29, 1998) is an American football wide receiver for the San Antonio Brahmas of the XFL. He played college football at Texas Tech University.

Early years
Vasher grew up in Wichita Falls, Texas, and attended S. H. Rider High School, where he played basketball and football. As a senior, Vasher had 1,169 receiving yards and nine touchdowns on 60 receptions and was named honorable mention Class 5A All-State and first-team Class 5A Dallas-Fort Worth All-Area. 

He was rated a four-star recruit and committed to play college football at Texas Tech over offers from Ohio State, Mississippi and Mississippi State and also over offers to play college basketball at SMU, Tulsa and Boise State.

College career
As a true freshman, Vasher caught two passes for nine yards in the season opener against Stephen F. Austin but suffered a season-ending injury and was granted a medical redshirt. He returned the following year and had 29 receptions for 545 yards and six touchdowns. 

As a redshirt sophomore, Vasher had 54 receptions for 687 yards and seven touchdowns. He had 42 receptions for 515 yards and six touchdowns in his redshirt junior season. As a redshirt senior, Vasher played in seven games and finished the season with 19 catches for 227 yards and two touchdowns.

Professional career

Dallas Cowboys
Vasher Guidry was signed as an undrafted free agent by the Dallas Cowboys after the 2021 NFL Draft on May 14. On August 31, he was placed on the reserve/non-football injury list. He was waived on August 30, 2021.

San Antonio Brahmas
Vasher was selected by the XFL San Antonio Brahmas in the Group 1 ninth round (67th overall) of the 2023 XFL Draft.

Personal life
Vasher's uncle, Nathan Vasher, is a former National Football League cornerback for the Chicago Bears.

References

External links
Texas Tech Red Raiders bio

Living people
People from Wichita Falls, Texas
Players of American football from Texas
American football wide receivers
Texas Tech Red Raiders football players
Dallas Cowboys players
San Antonio Brahmas players
1998 births